Luis Martínez (born February 9, 1990) is a Mexican footballer who last played for FC Tucson in USL League One.

Career
Martínez played four years college soccer at Chico State University between 2009 and 2013, although red-shirted the entire 2011 year.

After college, Martínez played with Premier Development League side San Jose Earthquakes U23, before moving to Costa Rican second division side AD Guanacasteca for 6-months.

Martínez returned to the PDL with FC Tucson in 2015.

On December 15, 2015, Martínez signed with United Soccer League side Oklahoma City Energy.

References

External links
 

1990 births
Living people
Association football midfielders
Chico State Wildcats men's soccer players
Expatriate soccer players in the United States
FC Tucson players
Footballers from Jalisco
Mexican expatriate footballers
OKC Energy FC players
People from Yuba County, California
San Jose Earthquakes U23 players
Soccer players from California
Sportspeople from Greater Sacramento
USL Championship players
USL League One players
USL League Two players
Mexican footballers